Nenad "Purke" Stojanović (born 22 October 1979) is a Serbian former professional footballer who played as a striker.

Career
After coming through the youth categories of Red Star Belgrade, Stojanović went on numerous loans, having a breakthrough season at Bosnian club Leotar in 2002–03. He was the team's top scorer with 22 goals in 23 league games, helping them win their first national title in history. Following his return to Red Star, Stojanović played mostly as a substitute and scored several crucial goals in the 2003–04 season, helping the side win the championship.

In January 2005, Stojanović was transferred to Belgian club Genk, signing a three-and-a-half-year contract. He also played for Brussels, before moving to Russian club Luch Vladivostok in early 2007. In the summer of 2008, Stojanović returned to Serbia and joined Vojvodina.

In July 2018, aged 38, Stojanović agreed terms with Belgrade Zone League side Leštane. He previously played for Brodarac 1947 (Spring 2015), IMT (2015–16), and Žarkovo (2016–17) in the Serbian League Belgrade.

Honours
Leotar
 Premier League of Bosnia and Herzegovina: 2002–03
Red Star Belgrade
 First League of Serbia and Montenegro: 2003–04
 Serbia and Montenegro Cup: 2003–04

References

External links
 
 
 
 

Association football forwards
Azerbaijan Premier League players
Belgian Pro League players
Expatriate footballers in Azerbaijan
Expatriate footballers in Belgium
Expatriate footballers in Bosnia and Herzegovina
Expatriate footballers in Montenegro
Expatriate footballers in Russia
FC Luch Vladivostok players
First League of Serbia and Montenegro players
FK Javor Ivanjica players
FK Jedinstvo Ub players
FK Leotar players
FK Lovćen players
FK Mladost Apatin players
FK Rudar Pljevlja players
FK Vojvodina players
FK Železnik players
K.R.C. Genk players
Montenegrin First League players
OFK Žarkovo players
Premier League of Bosnia and Herzegovina players
Red Star Belgrade footballers
Russian Premier League players
R.W.D.M. Brussels F.C. players
Serbia and Montenegro expatriate footballers
Serbia and Montenegro expatriate sportspeople in Belgium
Serbia and Montenegro expatriate sportspeople in Bosnia and Herzegovina
Serbia and Montenegro footballers
Serbian expatriate footballers
Serbian expatriate sportspeople in Azerbaijan
Serbian expatriate sportspeople in Belgium
Serbian expatriate sportspeople in Bosnia and Herzegovina
Serbian expatriate sportspeople in Montenegro
Serbian expatriate sportspeople in Russia
Serbian footballers
Serbian SuperLiga players
Simurq PIK players
Footballers from Belgrade
1979 births
Living people